Lenzener See (also Lenzer See) is a lake in the Rostock district in Ludwigslust-Parchim, Mecklenburg-Vorpommern, Germany. At an elevation of 41 m, its surface area is 0.62 km².

Lakes of Mecklenburg-Western Pomerania